Aleksandr Viktorovich Bukharov (born 11 January 1987) is a former Russian professional football player.

Club career
He played in the Russian Football National League for FC KAMAZ Naberezhnye Chelny in 2006.

External links
 
 

1987 births
People from Naberezhnye Chelny
Living people
Russian footballers
Association football midfielders
FC KAMAZ Naberezhnye Chelny players
FC Neftekhimik Nizhnekamsk players
FC Khimik Dzerzhinsk players
Sportspeople from Tatarstan